Crazy Mountain National Forest was established as the Crazy Mountain Forest Reserve in Montana by the U.S. Forest Service on August 10, 1906 with .  It became a National Forest on March 4, 1907. On July 1, 1908 it was combined with part Yellowstone National Forest to re-establish Absaroka National Forest and its name was discontinued.

The forest is part of the Jefferson Division of Lewis and Clark National Forest. The Crazy Mountains are included in the unit, primarily in Meagher County.

See also
 List of forests in Montana

References

External links
Lewis and Clark National Forest
Forest History Society
Listing of the National Forests of the United States and Their Dates (from the Forest History Society website) Text from Davis, Richard C., ed. Encyclopedia of American Forest and Conservation History. New York: Macmillan Publishing Company for the Forest History Society, 1983. Vol. II, pp. 743-788.

Former National Forests of Montana
Protected areas of Meagher County, Montana
1906 establishments in Montana